Richard Porter Giles (June 20, 1840 – November 17, 1896) was an American attorney and Democratic politician from Missouri.

Giles was born in Stephensburg, Kentucky, on June 20, 1840, to Granville T. and Rosanna Giles. Giles was educated at St. Paul's College and went into the field of law through reading the law at a Palmyra, Missouri law firm. Giles was admitted to the bar in 1868, practicing in St. Joseph, Palmyra, and Shelbina, Missouri. He was elected Prosecuting Attorney of Shelby County, Missouri, in 1880 and elected four times.

Giles was elected to the United States House of Representatives from Missouri's First Congressional District on November 3, 1896. However, Giles died 14 days later on November 17, 1896, before his term of office began. James Tilghman Lloyd was elected in a special election to succeed Giles on June 1, 1897.

See also
List of members-elect of the United States House of Representatives who never took their seats

Notes

External links

1840 births
1896 deaths
19th-century American lawyers
American lawyers admitted to the practice of law by reading law
Elected officials who died without taking their seats
Missouri Democrats
Missouri lawyers
People from Hardin County, Kentucky
People from Shelby County, Missouri